Satabdi Roy(born 5 October 1969) is an Indian actress, film director and politician. As an actress she is known for her work in Bengali cinema. She is the recipient of BFJA Awards for two times. As an actress, she ruled the array of commercial Bengali cinema during the late 1980s and 1990s. As a director, she has been denounced critically for her use of superfluous themes. She is a Trinamool Congress Member of Parliament, Lok Sabha since 2009.

Roy made her film debut opposite Prosenjit Chatterjee in Tapan Sinha's much acclaimed Bengali film Atanka (1986), which won her the BFJA Awards for the Best Supporting Actress in 1987. She shot to stardom after she had been paired with Tapas Paul in films such as Amar Bandhan (1986), Guru Dakshina (1987), Antaranga (1988), Apan Amar Apan (1990) and Abishkar (1990) to name a few. Her major hits with Prosenjit Chatterjee include Alingan (1990), Shraddhanjali (1993), Lathi (1996), Sakhi Tumi Kar (1996), Chandragrahan (1997), Ranokhetro (1998), Sajani Aamar Sohag (2000) and Trishul (2000) to name few. She made her Bollywood debut in National Award winning director Jyoti Sarup's Naya Zaher (1991). She collaborated with Tapan Sinha for the second time in his Antardhan (1992). She was conferred with the BFJA Awards for the Best Supporting Actress for the second time in 2005, for her performance in Raja Sen's Debipaksha. During her heyday, she was often compared to her contemporaries, such as Debashree Roy and Rituparna Sengupta. She made her directorial debut with Abhinetri (2006), which was an unequivocal reflection of the life and career of Bengali matinee idol Suchitra Sen. The film turned out to be a commercial as well as critical failure.

Early life
She was born in Agarpara to Shailen and Nilima Roy. Satabdi Roy passed her Madhyamik from Sorojini High School in 1986 and later attended Jogamaya Devi College, a women's college affiliated to the University of Calcutta.

Acting career

Debut and breakthrough (1986–1989)
Roy made her film debut opposite Prosenjit Chatterjee in Tapan Sinha's much acclaimed Bengali film Atanka (1986), which earned her the BFJA Award for Best Actress in a Supporting role in 1987. Earlier, she had worked in a film called Tina, directed by Dinen Gupta, but  it was never released. She rose to stardom after she acted opposite Tapas Paul in Tapan Saha's Amar Bandhan (1986).

In 1987, she had five releases including  Hiren Nag's Pratibha, Prabhat Roy's Pratikar, Anjan Mukhopadhyay's Nyay Adhikar, Biresh Chatterjee's Ekanta Apan and Anjan Choudhry's Guru Dakshina, which became a massive grosser at box office. She was paired with Tapas Paul in this film.

She reprised her chemistry with Paul in Dinen Gupta's Antaranga (1988) and Tarun Majumdar's Parashmani (1988). Both the films became massive grossers at box office.

She featured opposite Tapas Paul in Angar (1989) that became a major financial success.

Prime success (1990–2001)
The year 1990 saw Roy emerging out as a bankable film star with her two back-to-back commercial successes Apan Amar Apan by Tarun Majumdar and Abishkar by Salil Dutta. In both films, she played the role of an aspiring singer, but was noted more for her role in Abishkar, where she essayed a singer who set out in a quest of her kidnapped sister-in-law. She was also noted for her role in Tapan Saha's Alingan (1990). She went on to convey hits such as Nandan Dasgupta's Prem Pujari (1991), Deb Singha's Adhikar (1992), Guru Bagchi's Pennam Kolkata (1992), Prashanta Nanda's Ghar Sansar (1993), Lal Pan Bibi (1994), Srikanta Guhathakurta's Shraddhanjali (1993), Chiranjeet Chakraborty's Sansar Sangram (1995), Swapan Saha's Sakhi Tumi Kar (1996) and Anjan Banerjee's Chandragrahan (1997) to name a few. She made her Bollywood debut in National Award winning director Jyoti Sarup's Naya Zaher (1991).

She hit the pinnacle of her professional rivalry with Rituparna Sengupta in the late 1990s since the two were offered most of the female leads opposite Prosenjit Chatterjee after Debashree Roy vowed not to work with Chatterjee any longer. Still she managed to feature opposite Chatterjee in commercially successful Bengali films such as Lathi (1996), Sakhi Tumi Kar (1996), Bakul Priya (1997), Bidroho (1997), Chandragrahan (1997), Ranokhetro (1998), Swamir Aadesh (1998), Kalankini Badhu (2000), Sajoni Aamar Sohag (2000), Shapath Nilam (2000) and Trishul (2000).

Setback (2003–2013)
Her post-marital career was not successful. Swapan Saha cast her alongside Tapas Pal, Abhishek Chatterjee and Rituparna Sengupta in his family drama Sukh Dukkher Sansar (2003). The film was financial success. She then accepted the role of an embittered widow in Raja Sen's social drama Debipaksha (2004). Though a disaster at box office, the film fetched her another BFJA Award for Best Actress in a Supporting role in 2005.

Further roles (2016–2018)
She was approached to play the lead in Teesta, a stage adaptation of Bratya Basu's play Mukhomukhi Bosibar. Teesta was staged for the first time in January 2016. It was directed by Shekhar Samaddar and staged by Aabhash theatre group.

On 23 April 2016 Roy at the conference of the film Bizli (2018), declared that she would portray the antagonist Dr. Jerina in the film. Initially she was reluctant to play the role but finally gave her nod on Bobby's insistence. Her performance in the film was received well by critics.

Career as a filmmaker
In 2011, a member of Indian censor board informed the chief minister Mamata Banerjee that Maya Mukherjee, the protagonist in the film Paribartan directed by Roy was modelled on the chief minister. The film was later released in 2017.

Roy cast Rituparna Sengupta opposite Tapas Paul in her directorial venture Om Shanti (2012). When interrogated whether the professional rivalry of the actresses duo would affect the shooting, Roy declined any such rivalry. She rather presumed that their collaboration would appeal the viewers. She also cast Rakhi Sawant for an item number in the film. Sengupta skipped the premier show of the film as she felt that Sawant had been given preference to herself in the poster of the film while Roy said that Sengupta's grievance was baseless. The film received negative review. It was a major financial disaster.

Politics
She became the Member of Parliament, having won in the Lok Sabha election on a Trinamool Congress ticket from the Birbhum constituency of West Bengal in 2009.
She again won from the same constituency on a Trinamool Congress ticket in 2014 and 2019.

Personal life
When not working on a shoot, Roy would teach acting at the Satabdi Foundation or spend time with her son Samyoraj Banerjee (Tozo), daughter Samiyana Banerjee (Zumi) and husband Mrigank Banerjee, Executive manager of Satabdi Roy Foundation.

Awards

List of work

Hindi films

Bengali films

Odia films

Stage adaptation

Reality show

Literary works

References

External links

Living people
Actresses in Bengali cinema
Actresses in Hindi cinema
Indian film actresses
Bengali actresses
Actresses from Kolkata
1968 births
India MPs 2009–2014
Trinamool Congress politicians from West Bengal
Jogamaya Devi College alumni
University of Calcutta alumni
West Bengal politicians
Lok Sabha members from West Bengal
India MPs 2014–2019
Women in West Bengal politics
Women members of the Lok Sabha
Indian actor-politicians
21st-century Indian women politicians
21st-century Indian politicians
21st-century Indian actresses
20th-century Indian actresses
People from Birbhum district
India MPs 2019–present